Nueva Alborada is a district in the Itapúa Department of Paraguay.

Sources 
World Gazeteer: Paraguay – World-Gazetteer.com

Districts of Itapúa Department